K. Kuppuswamy is an Indian politician and a former Member of the Legislative Assembly of Tamil Nadu. He was elected to the Tamil Nadu legislative assembly as an Anna Dravida Munnetra Kazhagam candidate from Oddanchatram constituency in the 1980 and 1984 elections.

Awards
National Film Awards
 1961: Certificate of Merit for Third Best Feature Film in Malayalam - Sabarimala Ayyappan

References 

All India Anna Dravida Munnetra Kazhagam politicians
Living people
Year of birth missing (living people)

Tamil Nadu MLAs 1985–1989